Maurice Adevah-Pœuf (27 March 1943 – 10 May 2021) was a French politician and academic. A member of the Socialist Party, he served as a member of the National Assembly for Puy-de-Dôme's 5th constituency from 1981 to 1993 and again from 1997 to 2002. He also served as Mayor of Thiers from 1977 to 2001, General Councilor of the Canton of Thiers from 1979 to 1992, Regional Councilor of Auvergne from 1977 to 1986, and Founding President of the Livradois-Forez Regional Natural Park.

References

1943 births
2021 deaths
Deputies of the 7th National Assembly of the French Fifth Republic
Deputies of the 8th National Assembly of the French Fifth Republic
Deputies of the 11th National Assembly of the French Fifth Republic
Mayors of places in Auvergne-Rhône-Alpes
French general councillors
Regional councillors of France
Socialist Party (France) politicians
People from Puy-de-Dôme